Michael J. Horowitz (born January 2, 1964 in Ames, Iowa) is an American electrical engineer who actively participated in the creation of the H.264/MPEG-4 AVC and H.265/HEVC video coding standards. He is co-inventor of flexible macroblock ordering (FMO)  and tiles, essential features in H.264/MPEG-4 AVC and H.265/HEVC, respectively. He is Managing Partner of Applied Video Compression and has served on the Technical Advisory Boards of Vivox, Inc., Vidyo, Inc., and RipCode, Inc.

Education
 A.B. degree with distinction in physics from Cornell University, Ithaca, New York, 1986.
 M.S. degree in electrical engineering from Columbia University, New York, New York, 1988.
 Ph.D. in electrical engineering from The University of Michigan, Ann Arbor, 1998.

Professional work
Horowitz also has contributed to the early productization of several video coding standards:

 2000 – At Polycom, architect and developer of the first commercially available in-product implementation of macroblock-adaptive multiple reference frames (H.263 Annex U).  Macroblock-adaptive multiple reference frames has become a mainstay in subsequent video coding standards.
 2003 – At Polycom, architect and lead engineer of the team that produced the first commercially available in-product implementation of H.264/AVC.
 2008 – At Vidyo, architect and lead engineer of the team that developed the first commercially available in-product implementation of H.264 SVC
 2012 – At eBrisk Video, architect and lead engineer of the team that developed one of the first commercially available implementations of H.265/HEVC.
 2020 – At Google, Technical Lead of the AV1 for Duo project that became the first commercially available real-time interactive video implementation of AV1.

Standardization
 2001-2002 – VCEG Chair, Ad hoc Group on H.26L Complexity Reduction
 2002-2003 – JVT Chair, Ad hoc Group on H.26L Complexity Reduction
 2002-2003 – JVT Chair, Ad hoc Group on Robustness
 2008-2010 – VCEG Chair, Ad hoc Group on Computational Efficiency
 2011-2012 – JCT-VC Chair, Ad hoc Group on High-level Parallelism
 2020      – Alliance for Open Media Co-chair, RTC Subgroup

References 

21st-century American engineers
Cornell University alumni
Living people
People from Ames, Iowa
1964 births
University of Michigan College of Engineering alumni
American chief technology officers
Columbia School of Engineering and Applied Science alumni